Scuffy the Tugboat is a children's book written by Gertrude Crampton and illustrated by Tibor Gergely. The book was first published in 1946 as part of the Little Golden Books series.

Plot
Scuffy is a toy tugboat who wishes for "bigger things" than sailing in the bathtub. The Man with the Polkadot Tie (who owns a toy store) and his son take Scuffy to a small brook in a pasture, and soon the current carries him away. At first Scuffy is pleased. The brook grows into a stream which turns into a small river and finally a larger river. Scuffy is overwhelmed by the sheer size of things around him. As he is just about to sail off into the endless ocean, he is rescued by the man and his boy and returned to the bathtub where Scuffy is now content to remain.

Notes
 Scuffy doesn't have a series of books like Poky Little Puppy, Saggy Baggy Elephant, and Tawny Scrawny Lion.

External links
Little Golden Books: Scuffy the Tugboat

Tugboats in fiction
Little Golden Books
American picture books
1946 children's books